Andrew Jeffrey Schugel (born June 27, 1989) is an American professional baseball pitcher for the Milwaukee Milkmen of the American Association of Professional Baseball. He made his Major League Baseball (MLB) debut with the Arizona Diamondbacks in 2015 and has also played for the Pittsburgh Pirates.

Early life and education
Schugel was born in Winter Haven, Florida, and grew up in the Denver area. His father, Jeff, is a former catcher and infielder for the Minnesota Twins, selected in the 18th round of the 1983 Major League Baseball Draft. After three seasons as an active player, Jeff became a major league scout; he is currently with the Cincinnati Reds organization. Schugel's mother, Tammy, was a gymnast and hockey player in high school.

Schugel attended Mountain Vista High School in Highlands Ranch, Colorado, where, like his father, he played both hockey and baseball. He switched to baseball exclusively at Central Arizona College.

Career

Los Angeles Angels
Schugel was drafted by the Los Angeles Angels of Anaheim in the 25th round of the 2010 Major League Baseball Draft out of Central Arizona College. He made his professional debut for the rookie ball AZL Angels, and also appeared for the Orem Owlz, accumulating a 3.91 ERA in 17 games. In 2011, Schugel split the year between the High-A Inland Empire 66ers and the Single-A Cedar Rapids Kernels, pitching to a 5-5 record and 3.03 ERA with 95 strikeouts in 29 appearances. He spent 2012 in Double-A with the Arkansas Travelers, recording a 6-8 record and 2.89 ERA in 27 games. He spent the 2013 season in Triple-A with the Salt Lake Bees, but struggled to a 4-6 record and 7.05 ERA with 76 strikeouts in 19 appearances.

Arizona Diamondbacks
On December 13, 2013, Schugel was acquired by the Arizona Diamondbacks as the player to be named later from the trade in which they acquired Mark Trumbo. The Diamondbacks added Schugel to their 40-man roster on November 20, 2014.

On March 31, 2015, Schugel was optioned to Triple-A Reno. But less than two weeks later, on April 12, the Diamondbacks placed catcher Gerald Laird on the disabled list and recalled Schugel. He made his MLB debut that day, pitching three innings in relief against the Los Angeles Dodgers, giving up two runs, including a homer, on five hits. He finished the season appearing in 5 games. On December 8, 2015, Schugel was designated for assignment following the signing of Zack Greinke.

Seattle Mariners
On December 16, 2015, Schugel was claimed off waivers by the Seattle Mariners. On January 12, 2016, Schugel was designated for assignment by Seattle following the acquisition of Joe Wieland.

Pittsburgh Pirates
Schugel was claimed off waivers by the Pittsburgh Pirates on January 19, 2016. On February 3, Schugel was designated for assignment by the Pirates. He was sent outright the Indianapolis Indians, the Pirates Triple-A affiliate, on February 5. In his first season with the Pirates, he appeared in 36 games, posting an ERA of 3.63 in 52 innings. In 2017 with Pittsburgh, Schugel recorded a 4-0 record and a 1.97 ERA in 32 games. 

Schugel began 2018 on the injured list with a shoulder injury, and was later moved to the 60-day injured list on June 27. On August 25, 2018, Schugel was activated off of the 60-day disabled list and was outrighted off of the 40-man roster. Schugel did not appear in a game with Pittsburgh in 2018, and only made 17 appearances with Indianapolis and the High-A Bradenton Marauders before he elected free agency on October 2, 2018.

Milwaukee Milkmen
On February 19, 2020, Schugel signed with the Kansas City T-Bones of the American Association of Independent Professional Baseball. The T-Bones were not selected to compete in the condensed 60-game season due to the COVID-19 pandemic. He was later drafted by the Milwaukee Milkmen in the 2020 dispersal draft. Schugel won the American Association championship with the Milkmen in 2020. After the conclusion of the season on September 18, 2020, Schugel was returned to the Kansas City T-Bones. On January 15, 2021, Schugel was traded back to the Milwaukee Milkmen in exchange for cash.

New York Mets
On May 8, 2021, Schugel signed a minor league contract with the New York Mets organization. In 16 appearances for the Triple-A Syracuse Mets, Schugel had a 1-1 record with a 5.56 ERA and 21 strikeouts. On August 9, 2021, Schugel was released by the Mets.

Milwaukee Milkmen (second stint)
On March 24, 2022, Schugel signed with the Milwaukee Milkmen of the American Association.

References

External links

1989 births
Living people
Sportspeople from Winter Haven, Florida
Baseball players from Florida
Major League Baseball pitchers
Arizona Diamondbacks players
Pittsburgh Pirates players
Central Arizona Vaqueros baseball players
Arizona League Angels players
Orem Owlz players
Cedar Rapids Kernels players
Inland Empire 66ers of San Bernardino players
Arkansas Travelers players
Salt Lake Bees players
Mobile BayBears players
Indianapolis Indians players
Bradenton Marauders players
Milwaukee Milkmen players
Syracuse Mets players